Rotundiclipeus is a monotypic genus of crustaceans belonging to the monotypic family Rotundiclipeidae. The only species is Rotundiclipeus canariensis.

The species is found in Canary Islands.

References

Harpacticoida
Copepod genera
Monotypic crustacean genera